is a single and multiplayer action fighting game set in a fantasy setting. It was released on November 23, 2011 in Japan as a PS3 exclusive. The game was released in North America for Microsoft Windows and PlayStation 3 in 2012 by NIS America on behalf of developer Acquire.

The game is also known as Gladiator Vs., and is a part of the Gladiator series which has included Colosseum: Road to Freedom (2005, PS2) and Gladiator Begins (2010, PSP); the game is the first not to be set in ancient Rome.

The game includes single-player, cooperative (up to 3 player) and 3 vs. 3 player game modes, with player avatars including elf, human or orc.

Reception

The game received "unfavorable" reviews on both platforms according to video game review aggregator Metacritic. In Japan, Famitsu gave the PS3 version a score of two sixes and two fives for a total of 22 out of 40.

References

External links

 
 

2011 video games
Action-adventure games
PlayStation 3 games
Windows games
Cancelled Xbox 360 games
Fantasy video games
Video games developed in Japan
Multiplayer and single-player video games
Acquire (company) games
Nippon Ichi Software games